Haodlon Island is an island located within Coronation Gulf, south of Victoria Island, in the Kitikmeot Region, Nunavut, Canada.

Other islands in the vicinity include Anchor Island, Hatoayok Island, Hokagon Island, Kabviukvik Island, Mangak Island, Nanortut Island, and Nanukton Island, as well as the Berens Islands, Black Berry Islands, Deadman Islands, Home Islands, Lawford Islands, Leo Islands, and Sir Graham Moore Islands. The community of Kugkluktuk (formerly Coppermine) is located on the mainland,  to the south.

References

Islands of Coronation Gulf
Uninhabited islands of Kitikmeot Region